Events in the year 1185 in Japan.

Incumbents
Monarch: Antoku

Events
April 25 - The Genpei War ends with the Battle of Dan-no-ura

References 

 
 
Japan
Years of the 12th century in Japan